The Rodrigues solitaire (Pezophaps solitaria) is an extinct flightless bird that was endemic to the island of Rodrigues, east of Madagascar in the Indian Ocean. Genetically within the family of pigeons and doves, it was most closely related to the also extinct dodo of the nearby island Mauritius, the two forming the subfamily Raphinae. The Nicobar pigeon is their closest living genetic relative.

Rodrigues solitaires grew to the size of swans, and demonstrated pronounced sexual dimorphism. Its plumage was grey and brown; the female was paler than the male. It had a black band at the base of its slightly hooked beak, and its neck and legs were long. Both sexes were highly territorial, with large bony knobs on their wings that were used in combat. The Rodrigues solitaire laid a single egg that was incubated in turn by both sexes. Gizzard stones helped digest its food, which included fruit and seeds.

First mentioned during the 17th century, the Rodrigues solitaire was described in detail by François Leguat, the leader of a group of French Huguenot refugees who were marooned on Rodrigues in 1691–1693. It was hunted by humans and introduced animals, and was extinct by the late 18th century. Apart from Leguat's account and drawing, and a few other contemporary descriptions, nothing was known about the bird until a few subfossil bones were found in a cave in 1786. Thousands of bones have subsequently been excavated. It is the only extinct bird with a former constellation named after it, Turdus Solitarius.

Taxonomy
The French explorer François Leguat was the first to refer to the bird as the "solitaire" (referring to its solitary habits), but it has been suggested that he borrowed the name from a 1689 tract by his sponsor Marquis Henri Duquesne, which used the name "solitaire" in reference to the Réunion ibis. The bird was first scientifically named in 1789 as a species of dodo (Didus solitarius, based on Leguat's description) by the German naturalist Johann Friedrich Gmelin in the thirteenth edition of Systema Naturae. In 1786, subfossil Rodrigues solitaire bones encrusted in stalagmite were discovered in a cave and sent to the French naturalist Georges Cuvier in about 1830. For unknown reasons, he stated they had recently been found on Mauritius, which caused confusion, until they were compared with other bones from Rodrigues that were found to belong to the same species.

The English naturalists Hugh Edwin Strickland and Alexander Gordon Melville suggested the common descent of the Rodrigues solitaire and the dodo in 1848. They dissected the only known dodo specimen with soft tissue, comparing it with the few Rodrigues solitaire remains then available. Strickland stated that, although not identical, these birds shared many distinguishing features in the leg bones otherwise only known in pigeons. The fact that the Rodrigues solitaire laid only one egg, fed on fruits, was monogamous and cared for its nestlings also supported this relationship. The differences between the sexes of the bird were so large that Strickland thought they belonged to two species, naming the smaller female bird Pezophaps minor.

Additional subfossils were recovered during the 1860s, but more complete remains were found during the 1874 transit of Venus, since an observation station was located on the island. Many of these excavations were requested by the English ornithologists (and brothers) Alfred and Edward Newton, who used them to describe the osteology of the bird in detail. Thousands of bones were excavated, and mounted skeletons were composed from the remains of several specimens. Study of skeletal features by the Newtons indicated that the solitaire was morphologically intermediate between the dodo and ordinary pigeons, but differed from them in its unique carpal knob.

Some scientists believed that Réunion was home not only to a white dodo, but also to a white bird similar to the Rodrigues solitaire, both of which are now believed to be misinterpretations of old reports of the Réunion ibis. An atypical 17th-century description of a dodo and bones found on Rodrigues, now known to have belonged to the Rodrigues solitaire, led the British taxidermist Abraham Dee Bartlett to name a new species, Didus nazarenus; it is now a junior synonym of this species.

At one point it was suggested that the skeleton of this species is the best described after that of humans. In spite of the evidence, some later scholars doubted Leguat's story, and the existence of the Rodrigues solitaire. In 1921, the American linguist Geoffroy Atkinson claimed Leguat's memoir was merely a novel, and that the man had never even existed, and in 1955, the British ecologist George Evelyn Hutchinson doubted aspects of the bird's biology mentioned by Leguat. Today, it is widely accepted that Leguat's memoirs are credible observations of the bird in life.

For many years the dodo and the Rodrigues solitaire were placed in a family of their own, the Raphidae (formerly Dididae), because their exact relationships with other pigeons were unresolved. Each was also placed in a monotypic family (Raphidae and Pezophapidae, respectively), as it was thought that they had evolved their similarities independently. Osteological and DNA analysis has since led to the dissolution of the family Raphidae, and the dodo and solitaire are now placed in their own subfamily, Raphinae, within the family Columbidae.

Evolution
In 2002, American geneticist Beth Shapiro and colleagues analysed the DNA of the dodo and the Rodrigues solitaire for the first time. Comparison of mitochondrial cytochrome b and 12S rRNA sequences isolated from the femur of a Rodrigues solitaire and the tarsal of a dodo confirmed their close relationship and their placement within the Columbidae. The genetic evidence was interpreted as showing the Southeast Asian Nicobar pigeon (Caloenas nicobarica) to be their closest living relative, followed by the crowned pigeons (Goura) of New Guinea, and the superficially dodo-like tooth-billed pigeon (Didunculus strigirostris) from Samoa. This clade consists of generally ground-dwelling island endemic pigeons. The following cladogram shows the closest relationships of the dodo and the Rodrigues solitaire within Columbidae, based on Shapiro et al., 2002:

A similar cladogram was published in 2007, inverting the placement of Goura and Didunculus and including the pheasant pigeon (Otidiphaps nobilis) and the thick-billed ground pigeon (Trugon terrestris) at the base of the clade. Based on behavioural and morphological evidence, Jolyon C. Parish proposed that the dodo and Rodrigues solitaire should be placed in the Gourinae subfamily along with the Goura pigeons and others, in agreement with the genetic evidence. In 2014, DNA of the only known specimen of the recently extinct spotted green pigeon (Caloenas maculata) was analysed, and it was found to be a close relative of the Nicobar pigeon, and thus also the dodo and Rodrigues solitaire.

The 2002 study indicated that the ancestors of the Rodrigues solitaire and the dodo diverged around the Paleogene–Neogene boundary. The Mascarene Islands (Mauritius, Réunion, and Rodrigues), are of volcanic origin and are less than 10 million years old. Therefore, the ancestors of both birds probably remained capable of flight for a considerable time after the separation of their lineage. The Nicobar and spotted green pigeon were placed at the base of a lineage leading to the Raphinae, which indicates the flightless raphines had ancestors that were able to fly, were semi-terrestrial, and inhabited islands. This in turn supports the hypothesis that the ancestors of those birds reached the Mascarene islands by island hopping from South Asia. The lack of mammalian herbivores competing for resources on these islands allowed the solitaire and the dodo to attain very large sizes. The dodo lost the ability to fly owing to the lack of mammalian predators on Mauritius. Another large, flightless pigeon, the Viti Levu giant pigeon (Natunaornis gigoura), was described in 2001 from subfossil material from Fiji. It was only slightly smaller than the Rodrigues solitaire and the dodo, and it too is thought to have been related to the crowned pigeons.

Description

The beak of the Rodrigues solitaire was slightly hooked, and its neck and legs were long. One observer described it as the size of a swan. A black band (a contemporary description described it as a "frontlet") appeared on its head just behind the base of the beak. The plumage of the Rodrigues solitaire was described as grey and brown. Females were paler than males and had  elevations on the lower neck.

Sexual size dimorphism in this species is perhaps the greatest in any neognath bird. Males were considerably larger than females, measuring 90 cm (35 in) in length and weighing up to 28 kg (62 lb), whereas females were 70 cm (28 in) and weighed 17 kg (37 lb). This is only 60% of the weight of a mature male. Their weight may have varied substantially due to fat cycles, meaning that individuals were fat during cool seasons, but slim during hot seasons, and may have been as low as 21 kg in males and 13 kg in females. Though male pigeons are usually larger than females, there is no direct evidence for the largest specimens actually being the males of the species, and this has only been assumed based on early works. Though the male was probably largest, this can only be confirmed by molecular sexing techniques, and not skeletal morphology alone.

Members of both sexes possessed a large tuberous knob of bone exostosis situated at the base of the carpometacarpus of each wrist. Other wing bones also sometimes show similar structures. The knob was cauliflower-like in appearance, and consisted of up to two or three lobes. The knobs were about half the length of the metacarpus, were larger in males than females, and described as the size of a musket ball. One study measured the largest knob to be  in diameter. The knobs vary in size across individuals, and were entirely absent from 58% of specimens examined for the study. These are thought to be immature birds, or birds without territory. The carpometacarpi of males without the knobs were smaller on average than those with it, but there was little difference between the females. In life, the knobs would have been covered by tough cartilaginous or keratinous integument, which would have made them appear even larger. Carpal spurs and knobs are also known from other extant as well as extinct birds. Within Columbidae, the crowned pigeons and the Viti Levu giant pigeon have outgrowths on the carpometacarpus which are similar to those of the female Rodrigues solitaire. Other well known examples are the steamer ducks, the torrent duck, sheathbills, screamers, the spur-winged goose, and the extinct Jamaican ibis, Xenicibis xympithecus.

The Rodrigues solitaire shared traits with the dodo, its closest relative, such as size and features in the skull, pelvis, and sternum. It differed in other aspects; it was taller and more slender than the dodo and had a smaller skull and beak, a flatter skull roof, and larger orbits. Its neck and legs were proportionally longer, and the dodo did not possess an equivalent to the carpal knob of the Rodrigues solitaire. Many skeletal features of the Rodrigues solitaire and dodo that are unique among pigeons have evolved to adapt to flightlessness. Their pelvic elements were thicker than those of flighted birds (to support their greater weight), and their pectoral region and wings were paedomorphic (underdeveloped, retaining juvenile features). However, the skull, trunk, and pelvic limbs were peramorphic, which means they changed considerably with maturity.

Contemporary descriptions

Apart from Leguat's rather simple depiction, the life appearance of the Rodrigues solitaire is only known from a handful of descriptions; no soft-tissue remains survive. Leguat devoted three pages of his memoirs to the Rodrigues solitaire, and was clearly impressed by the bird. He described its appearance as follows:

Several of Leguat's observations were later confirmed through study of subfossil Rodrigues solitaire remains. The curved contour lines of the pelvis also support the roundness of its hind parts, which he compared to that of a horse. Also, a ridged surface appears at the base of the beak, indicating the position of the caruncular ridge, which Leguat described as a "widow's peak". Before fossils of the carpal knob were found, Strickland noted that the keel of the sternum of the Rodrigues solitaire was so well-developed as to almost indicate it had possessed the power of flight; however, since the humerus was very short he inferred that this was instead related to Leguat's claim that they used their wings for defence.

Leguat continued with an elaborate description of the female Rodrigues solitaire, which also appears to be the sex depicted in his illustration of the bird:

It has been proposed that Leguat's comparison between the crop of the female Rodrigues solitaire and the "beautiful bosom of a woman" (changed to "fine neck" in some editions of his memoirs) was out of longing for female companionship.

Leguat's statements were confirmed by another description by Julien Tafforet, who wrote in 1726:

Behaviour and ecology

Observations of the Rodrigues solitaire in life indicate that they were highly territorial. They presumably settled disputes by striking each other with their wings; to aid this purpose, they used the knobs on their wrists. Fractures in their wing bones also indicate that they were used in combat. It has also been suggested that these fractures may have been the result of a hereditary bone disease rather than battle-injuries. But in all extant birds where carpal spurs and knobs are present, these are used as weapons without exceptions. Though some dodo bones have been found with healed fractures, it had weak pectoral muscles and more reduced wings in comparison with the Rodrigues solitaire. Since Rodrigues receives less rainfall and has more seasonal variation than Mauritius, which would have affected the availability of resources on the island, the Rodrigues solitaire would have more reason to evolve aggressive territorial behaviour. Several accounts state that they also defended themselves with a powerful bite.

In addition to their use as weapons, both sexes of the Rodrigues solitaire also used their wings for communication. The wings could create low-frequency sounds for communicating with mates, or to warn rivals, but it is unknown exactly how this sound was created. The sound could be heard 200 yards (182 m) away, and this may therefore be the size of the territory of an individual. Other species of birds (e.g., club-winged manakin) are also known to use their wings to create sounds that attract mates or mark their territory.

In 1869, the Newton brothers suggested that the carpal knobs may have been formed through continuous injuries, as they resemble diseased bone. It has also been claimed that the carpal knobs were instead formed due to a hereditary disease caused by inbreeding. This was dismissed in a 2013 study, since such lesions would likely not occur only in a specific part of the skeleton, but would appear in any growing bone tissue. If such a disease was due to inbreeding, it would also be present in other isolated island bird populations, but it is not. The authors instead suggested that the wing bones contained metaplastic tissue able to form the knob. This development was either in response to continuous impacts during combat, or to hormones released when individuals paired up and acquired territories. It appears a male which had long held a territory would possess especially large carpal knobs, and that their mates would have such developments as well, only smaller.

Some evidence, including their large size and the fact that tropical and frugivorous birds have slower growth rates, indicates that the Rodrigues solitaire may have had a protracted development period. Based on mass estimates, it has been suggested the male could reach the age of 28, and the female 17. The French economist Pierre-André d'Héguerty, writing about his time on the island around 1735, stated that a captive Rodrigues solitaire (which he described as having a melancholic appearance) would always walk in the same line until running out of space, and then return. The species may have lived primarily in the island's woodlands, rather than on the shores.

Many other of the endemic species of Rodrigues became extinct after the arrival of humans, so the ecosystem of the island is heavily damaged. Before humans arrived, forests covered the island entirely, but very little remains today due to deforestation. The Rodrigues solitaire lived alongside other recently extinct birds such as the Rodrigues rail, the Rodrigues parrot, Newton's parakeet, the Rodrigues starling, the Rodrigues scops owl, the Rodrigues night heron, and the Rodrigues pigeon. Extinct reptiles include the domed Rodrigues giant tortoise, the saddle-backed Rodrigues giant tortoise, and the Rodrigues day gecko.

Diet

Leguat stated that the Rodrigues solitaire fed on dates, whereas Tafforet mentioned seeds and leaves. No other accounts mention diet. It has been suggested it ate latan palm fruits, for which it competed with the now extinct Cylindraspis tortoises. It is not known how the young were fed, but related pigeons provide crop milk. The risings on the crop of the female may have covered glands that produced the crop milk. If the theory is correct, the birds may have practiced a division of labour, where the female stayed and fed the young crop milk, while the male collected food in the crop and delivered it to the female. It has been suggested that the maximum size attained by the solitaire and the dodo was limited by the amount of crop milk they were able to produce for their young during early growth.

Several contemporary accounts state that the Rodrigues solitaire used gizzard stones. Dodos also did this, which may imply a similar diet. Leguat described the stones in the following passage, mentioning that Rodrigues solitaires refused to feed in captivity:

In 1877 three stones were found in a cavern on Rodrigues, each near a Rodrigues solitaire skeleton, and were inferred to be the gizzard stones mentioned by Leguat. One of the stones was examined and found to be dolerite: somewhat rough, hard and heavy, but hardly flat on one side as described by Leguat. This could be due to its association with a young individual. Although Leguat asserted that the bird hatched with the gizzard stone already inside, in reality adults most likely fed the stones to their hatchlings.

Reproduction

The most detailed account of the reproductive habits of the Rodrigues solitaire is Leguat's. He described mating and nesting as follows:

The clutch was described as consisting of a single egg; given the bird's large size, this led to proposals that the solitaire was K-selected, which means it produced a low number of altricial offspring, which required extensive parental care until maturity. The gathering of unrelated juveniles suggests that they formed crèches, which may have followed foraging adults as part of the learning process. A study of subfossil remains found that the carpal knob only developed after the bird reached skeletal maturity.

Tafforet's account confirms Leguat's description of reproductive behaviour, adding that Rodrigues solitaires would even attack humans approaching their chicks:

The size difference between sexes has led to the suggestion that the Rodrigues solitaire was not monogamous as stated by Leguat, and that this deeply religious man attributed the trait to the bird for moral reasons. It has been proposed that it was instead polygynous, and the wing-rattling behaviour described for males suggests lek-mating, where males gather for competitive mating display. However, size dimorphism does occur in some monogamous birds; most other pigeons are monogamous as well. A 2015 article proposed that males invited females into their territories as secondary mates, which would result in the resident female acting aggressively towards the newcomer. Similar behaviour is seen in species that practice resource-defence polygyny. The territories probably provided all the food the birds needed in addition to acting as breeding-areas, and there was probably intense competition for favourable territories. The fact that Rodrigues island shrank by 90% at the end of the Pleistocene may also have contributed to such competition over territories, and thereby furthered sexual dimorphism.

Relationship with humans

The Dutch viceadmiral Hans Hendricksz Bouwer was the first to list "dodos", most likely referring to the Rodrigues solitaire, as part of the fauna of Rodrigues in 1601. The English traveller Sir Thomas Herbert mentioned "dodos" on Rodrigues again in 1634, and they were also mentioned in 1700. The next account, which was the first referring to the bird as the "solitaire", was published in François Leguat's 1708 memoir, A New Voyage to the East Indies. Leguat was the leader of a group of nine French Huguenot refugees, who were the first to colonise the island from 1691 to 1693, after they were marooned there by their captain. His description of the Rodrigues solitaire and its behaviour is the most detailed account of the bird in life, and he also described other species that are now extinct. Leguat's observations are considered some of the first cohesive accounts of animal behaviour in the wild. He later left for Mauritius, but was too late to observe dodos there. 

The Huguenots praised the Rodrigues solitaires for their flavour, especially that of the young, and used their gizzard stones as knife sharpeners. D'Héguerty later claimed these were also useful in medicine, and referred to them as bezoars. The second most detailed description of the bird was found in an anonymous document rediscovered in 1874 called Relation de l'Ile Rodrigue, which has been attributed to Julien Tafforet, a mariner marooned on Rodrigues in 1726. His observations are considered credible, though it is known he had a copy of Leguat's memoirs with him during his stay.

Many old accounts mention that Rodrigues solitaires were hunted by humans. The Danish zoologist Japetus Steenstrup noted that some Rodrigues solitaire remains bore traces of having been broken by a human or perhaps another large predator, to extract bone marrow. Writing in 1735, the French lieutenant Gennes de la Chancelière described the capture and consumption of two specimens as follows:

Unlike the dodo, no Rodrigues solitaires are known to have been sent to Europe alive. However, it has been claimed that the French naval officer Bertrand-François Mahé de La Bourdonnais sent a "solitaire" to France from the nearby island of Réunion around 1740. Since the Réunion solitaire is believed to have become extinct by this date, the bird may actually have been a Rodrigues solitaire.

Extinction
The Rodrigues solitaire probably became extinct sometime between the 1730s and 1760s; the exact date is unknown. Its disappearance coincided with the tortoise trade between 1730 and 1750; traders burnt off vegetation, hunted solitaires and imported cats and pigs that preyed on eggs and chicks. In 1755, the French engineer Joseph-François Charpentier de Cossigny attempted to obtain a live specimen, as he had been assured the Rodrigues solitaire still survived in remote areas of the island. Though trying for 18 months, and offering large rewards, none could be found. He noted that cats were blamed for decimating the species, but suspected that it was due to hunting by humans instead. The French astronomer Alexandre Guy Pingré did not encounter any solitaires when he visited Rodrigues to observe the 1761 transit of Venus, although he had been assured they survived. His friend, the French astronomer Pierre Charles Le Monnier named the constellation Turdus Solitarius after the bird to commemorate the journey. Although the Rodrigues solitaire is the only extinct bird to have a former constellation named for it, celestial mapmakers did not know what it looked like and star maps depicted other birds.

By the time the discovery of subfossil Rodrigues solitaire bones from 1786 onwards confirmed Leguat's descriptions, no living residents of Rodrigues remembered having seen live specimens. In 1831, a man who had lived on Rodrigues for 40 years said that he had never seen birds large enough to be Rodrigues solitaires. Rodrigues covers only , making it implausible that the bird would have survived undetected.

References

External links
 
 

Extinct birds of Indian Ocean islands
Extinct flightless birds
Fauna of Rodrigues
Rodrigues solitaire
Bird extinctions since 1500
Rodrigues solitaire
Rodrigues solitaire